The British Radio and Valve Manufacturers' Association (BVA) was a 20th-century cartel of vacuum tube (valve) manufacturers in the United Kingdom of Great Britain and Northern Ireland (UK) that was designed to protect their interests from foreign competition.  This cartel dictated (among other things), the price of valves (vacuum tubes) and how they were numbered. 

The numbering scheme was supposedly designed to make it difficult to identify American equivalents, which were typically half the retail price in their home country; however American types manufactured in the UK by companies such as Brimar sold at the same price as their UK counterparts due to the BVA's insistence. All manufacturers eventually published their own lists of 'equivalents' between their own valves and those of other manufacturers including American types, so cross-referencing became easy, in the UK at least. 

The BVA dictated that no more than one electrode structure could be contained within one envelope, because the association levied a charge of initially £1 per valveholder, to cover royalties on any of its members' patent rights.  Pressure from set-makers for multi-structure valves to overcome the BVA's edict led to British and European manufacturers introducing multi-structure valves and these eventually became common. 

Vacuum tubes
Trade associations based in the United Kingdom
Cartels